Massachusetts House of Representatives' 4th Essex district in the United States is one of 160 legislative districts included in the lower house of the Massachusetts General Court. It covers part of Essex County. Democrat Estela Reyes has represented the district since 2023.

Towns represented
The district includes the following localities:
 Hamilton
 Ipswich
 Manchester-by-the-Sea
 Rowley
 Topsfield
 Wenham

The current district geographic boundary overlaps with those of the Massachusetts Senate's 1st Essex and Middlesex and 2nd Essex districts.

Former locales
The district previously covered:
 Andover, circa 1872 
 North Andover, circa 1872

Representatives
 Francis P. Putnam, circa 1858-1859 
 Michael Carney, circa 1888 
 Frank A. Oberti, circa 1920 
 George Pearl Webster, circa 1920 
 Alyce Louise Schlapp, circa 1945
 Harvey Armand Pothier, circa 1951 
 Kevin M. Burke, circa 1975 
 Forrester Clark
 James Colt
 Bradford Hill, 1999-2021
 Jamie Belsito, 2021–2023
 Estela Reyes, 2023–present

See also
 List of Massachusetts House of Representatives elections
 Other Essex County districts of the Massachusetts House of Representatives: 1st, 2nd, 3rd, 5th, 6th, 7th, 8th, 9th, 10th, 11th, 12th, 13th, 14th, 15th, 16th, 17th, 18th
 Essex County districts of the Massachusett Senate: 1st, 2nd, 3rd; 1st Essex and Middlesex; 2nd Essex and Middlesex
 List of Massachusetts General Courts
 List of former districts of the Massachusetts House of Representatives

Images

References

External links
 Ballotpedia
  (State House district information based on U.S. Census Bureau's American Community Survey).
 League of Women Voters Cape Ann
 League of Women Voters of Topsfield-Boxford-Middleton
 League of Women Voters of Hamilton-Wenham

House
Government of Essex County, Massachusetts